(August 21, 1937 – February 25, 2021) was a Japanese voice actress who has worked primarily in anime.

She died on February 25, 2021.

Filmography

Anime

Television 
 Perman (1967), Ganko
 Under Sea Boy Marine (1969), Kurikuri
 Umeboshi Denka (1969), Umeboshi-Queen
 Attack No. 1 (1969), Yoshiko Katori
 Kashi no Ki Mokku (1972)
 Kerokko Demetan (1973)
 Dog of Flanders (1975), Paul
 Laura, a Little Girl on the Prairie (1975), Mary
 Nobody's Boy: Remi (1977), Remi
 Lupin III: Part II (1977), Romanofu (ep 146)
 Bannertail: The Story of Gray Squirrel (1979), Clea
 Adventures of Tom Sawyer (1980)
 Astro Boy  (1980), Uran
 Ohayo! Spank (1981), Futaba
 Meiken Jolie (1981)
 Ninja Hattori-kun (1981), Kenichi Mitsuba
 Superbook (1981), Tottori Ryo
 Urusei Yatsura (1981), Little Tanuki (O-shima) (ep 52)
 Chikkun Takkun (1984), Tick Duck
 Ranma ½ (1989), Yukinko (ep 124)
 Sorcerer Hunters (1995), Lake (ep 4)

Films 
 Space Boy Soran (1965), Chappy
 Hokkyoku no Muushika Miishika (1979), Muushika
 Ie Naki Ko (1980), Reni
 Doraemon: Nobita no Uchū Kaitakushi (1981), Roppuru
 Bremen 4: Angels in Hell (1981), Trio
 Nausicaä of the Valley of the Wind (1984), Girl A
 Urusei Yatsura: Remember My Love (1985), Oshima the Tanuki

Original video animations 
 Aim for the Ace! Final Stage (1988), Maki Aikawa
 Aim for the Ace! 2 (1988), Maki Aikawa

Dubbing

Live Action Films
 Child's Play 2 - Andy Barclay (Alex Vincent)
 Dragonworld - Miss Twittingham (Janet Henfrey)
 Eaten Alive - Angie (Kyle Richards)
 The Goonies - Richard "Data" Wang (Ke Huy Quan) (1988 TBS Dub)
 The Omen - Damien Thorn (Harvey Spencer Stephens) (Laserdisc edition)

Live Action Television
 The Man from U.N.C.L.E. - #4

References

External links
 Masako Sugaya Personal Data at ARTSVISION (Japanese)
 
 Masako Sugaya at GamePlaza-Haruka Voice Acting Database 
 Masako Sugaya at Hitoshi Doi's Seiyuu Database 

1937 births
2021 deaths
Japanese voice actresses
Voice actresses from Tokyo